Rhinolophus monticolus or Mountain horseshoe bat is a species of bat in the family Rhinolophidae. It is found from Greater Mekong in Southeast Asia.

Description

Size
Small bat, with the length of the head and body between 42.3 and 48.5 mm, the length of the forearm between 41.2 and 44.1 mm, the length of the tail between 19.7 and 25.6 mm, the length of the foot between 7.4 and 8.6 mm, the length of the ears between 15.5 and 48.5 mm.

Appearance
The backbone parts are dark brown, while the ventral parts are lighter. The base of the hair is complete white. The nasal leaf is brown and has a high lancet, with a blunt tip and concave margins, a relatively long connective process, pointed and projected forward, the wide saddle, with parallel edges and the square end. In some individuals the nasal leaf is coated with a layer of orange liquid with an unknown function. The lower lip has three longitudinal furrows. The tail is long and completely included in the wide uropatagium. The second lower premolar is very small and rounded.

Ecolocation
It emits high-cycle ultrasound with constant frequency pulses of 83.6-93 kHz.

Biology

Behavior
It probably takes refuge in the cavities of the trees or in fissures of the rocks.

Feeding
It feeds on insects.

Distribution and habitat
This species is widespread in central-western and northern Thailand and northern Laos.

It lives in the mountain evergreen forests between 620 and 1.320 meters of altitude.

References 

Rhinolophidae
Mammals described in 2016
Bats of Southeast Asia